Psathyrocerus is a genus of leaf beetles in the subfamily Eumolpinae. It is distributed in South America. It is placed in the tribe Habrophorini with the related genus Habrophora.

Species
 Psathyrocerus cyanipennis Clark, 1866
 Psathyrocerus fulvipes Blanchard, 1851
 Psathyrocerus oblongus (Blanchard, 1851)
 Psathyrocerus pallipes Blanchard, 1851
 Psathyrocerus unicolor (Blanchard, 1851)
 Psathyrocerus variegatus Blanchard, 1851

Synonyms:
 Psathyrocerus fuscoornatus Clark, 1866: moved to Habrophora

References

Eumolpinae
Chrysomelidae genera
Beetles of South America
Taxa named by Émile Blanchard